The Unknown is an anthology of fantasy fiction short stories edited by D. R. Bensen and illustrated by Edd Cartier, the second of a number of anthologies drawing their contents from the American magazine Unknown of the 1930s-1940s. It was first published in paperback by Pyramid Books in April 1963. It was reprinted by the same publisher in October 1970, and by Jove/HBJ in August 1978 A companion anthology, The Unknown Five, was issued in 1964.

The book collects eleven tales by various authors, together with a foreword by Isaac Asimov and an introduction by the editor.

Contents
 "Foreword" (Isaac Asimov)
 "Introduction" (D. R. Bensen)
 "The Misguided Halo" (Henry Kuttner) (Unknown, Aug. 1939)
 "Prescience" (Nelson S. Bond) (Unknown Worlds, Oct. 1941)
 "Yesterday Was Monday" (Theodore Sturgeon) (Unknown Fantasy Fiction, June 1941)
 "The Gnarly Man" (L. Sprague de Camp) (Unknown, June 1939)
 "The Bleak Shore" (Fritz Leiber) (Unknown Fantasy Fiction, Nov. 1940)
 "Trouble with Water" (H. L. Gold) (Unknown, Mar. 1939)
 "Doubled and Redoubled" (Malcolm Jameson) (Unknown Fantasy Fiction, Feb. 1941)
 "When It Was Moonlight" (Manly Wade Wellman) (Unknown Fantasy Fiction, Feb. 1940)
 "Mr. Jinx" (Fredric Brown and Robert Arthur (as by Arthur alone)) (Unknown Fantasy Fiction, Aug. 1941)
 "Snulbug" (Anthony Boucher) (Unknown Worlds, Dec. 1941)
 " Armageddon" (Fredric Brown) (Unknown Fantasy Fiction, Aug. 1941)

Notes

1963 anthologies
Fantasy anthologies
Works originally published in Unknown (magazine)
Pyramid Books books